The Ambassador of the United Kingdom to Iran is the United Kingdom's foremost diplomatic representative in the Islamic Republic of Iran, and in charge of the UK's diplomatic mission in Iran. The official title is His Majesty's Ambassador to the Islamic Republic of Iran.

Although Britain and Iran (originally Persia) did not enter into formal diplomatic relations until 1807, British and Iranians had been in informal contact since the early 17th century when the East India Company developed trade links with the Persian kingdom. Initially, diplomatic missions comprised a legation until they were promoted to embassy status in 1943. 

At various times in history during crises or disputes, Britain has had no diplomatic presence in the country, and has either relied on other nations as protecting powers, or has had a non-resident diplomat.

Heads of Mission

Envoys Extraordinary and Ministers Plenipotentiary (1807–1944)
1807–1811: Sir Harford Jones-Brydges, 1st Baronet, envoy extraordinary
1810–1814: Sir Gore Ouseley, Bt, ambassador extraordinary and plenipotentiary
April 1814–October 1815: James Morier, Minister Plenipotentiary (ad interim)
13 April 1814: Sir Henry Ellis, Deputy Minister Plenipotentiary (ad interim), in James Morier's absence
1815–22, 1823–26: Henry Willock, chargé d'affaires
1822–23: Major George Willock, deputy chargé d'affaires
29 July 1826: Colonel John Macdonald Kinneir, Envoy Extraordinary from Government of India
4 December 1833: Sir John Campbell, appointed to negotiate a treaty
1835–1836: Sir Henry Ellis, ambassador
1836–1842: Sir John McNeill, envoy extraordinary and minister plenipotentiary
No representation during the Siege of Herat
1844–1854: Lieutenant-Colonel Sir Justin Sheil, secretary of legation February 1836, Head of Mission 1839–44, envoy extraordinary and minister plenipotentiary 1844–54
1847–49: Lieutenant-Colonel Francis Farrant, chargé d'affaires
1849, 1853–55: Sir William Taylour Thomson, chargé d'affaires
1854–1855: Sir Charles Murray, envoy extraordinary and minister plenipotentiary
1855–1857: No representation due to the Anglo-Persian War
1857–1858: Sir Charles Murray, envoy extraordinary and minister plenipotentiary
1858–59: William Doria, chargé d'affaires
1859–1860: Lieutenant-Colonel Sir Henry Rawlinson, envoy extraordinary and minister plenipotentiary
November–December 1859: Sir Ronald Thomson, chargé d'affaires
1860–1872: Charles Alison, envoy extraordinary and minister plenipotentiary April 1872
May–July 1860: Captain (later Colonel Sir) Lewis Pelly, chargé d'affaires
November–December 1862: Sir Ronald Thomson, chargé d'affaires
December 1862–January 1863: Edward Eastwick, chargé d'affaires
1863, 1869–70: Sir Ronald Thomson, chargé d'affaires
April–May 1872: William Dickson, chargé d'affaires
1872–73: Sir Ronald Thomson, chargé d'affaires
1872–1879: Sir William Taylour Thomson, envoy extraordinary and minister plenipotentiary
1878–79: Sir Ronald Thomson, chargé d'affaires
1879–1887: Sir Ronald Ferguson Thomson, envoy extraordinary and minister plenipotentiary
1885–86: Sir Arthur Nicolson, chargé d'affaires
1887–1891: Sir Henry Drummond Wolff
1889, November 1890, November 1891: Robert John Kennedy, chargé d'affaires
1891–1894: Sir Frank Lascelles
1894: Sir Conyngham Greene, chargé d'affaires
1894–1900: Sir Mortimer Durand
1897–98: Lord Hardinge, chargé d'affaires
March 1900–1901: Sir Cecil Spring Rice, chargé d'affaires
October 1900–1906: Sir Arthur Hardinge (appointed Consul-General)
October–November 1902: William Erskine, chargé d'affaires
1904, 1905: Evelyn Grant Duff, chargé d'affaires
1906–1908: Sir Cecil Spring Rice
1908–1912: Sir George Barclay
1912–1915: Sir Walter Townley
1915–1918: Sir Charles Marling
1918–1920: Sir Percy Cox (ad interim)
1920–1921: Herman Norman
1921–1926: Sir Percy Loraine, Bt
1926–1931: Sir Robert Clive
1931–1934: Sir Reginald Hoare
1934–1936: Sir Hughe Knatchbull-Hugessen
1936–1939: Sir Horace Seymour
1942–1944: Sir Reader Bullard

Ambassadors Extraordinary and Plenipotentiary (1944–1980)
1944–1946: Sir Reader Bullard
1946–1950: Sir John Le Rougetel
1950–1952: Sir Francis Shepherd
1952–1953: No representation due to the nationalisation of the Anglo-Persian Oil Company
1954–1958: Sir Roger Stevens
1958–1963: Sir Geoffrey Harrison
1963–1971: Sir Denis Wright
1971–1974: Hon. Sir Peter Ramsbotham
1974–1979: Sir Anthony Parsons
1979–1980: Sir John Graham

Head of British Interests Section, Royal Swedish Embassy, Tehran (1980–1990)
In 1980 Britain closed its embassy in Tehran after a brief occupation of the compound in the wake of the Iran hostage crisis, the Iranian Embassy siege and was subsequently represented in the country by Sweden as a protecting power. Nonetheless, a small detachment of British personnel maintained a presence at the Swedish Embassy.
1980–1981: Stephen Barrett
1981–1983: Nicholas John Barrington C.V.O. 

1982-1988: Michael Simpson-Orlebar followed by Christopher Macrae. In May 1986 Iran blocked the appointment of Hugh James Arbuthnott as head of the British Interests Section in the Swedish embassy in Tehran. This was in retaliation for Britain refusing to accept Hussein Malouk as Iranian chargé d'affaires in London, due to his participation in the 1979 student takeover of the U.S. embassy,
1988: Paul Andrew Ramsay Senior Visa Officer British Interests Section, Tehran
1989–1990: No representation due to the fatwā issued against Salman Rushdie

Ambassadors Extraordinary and Plenipotentiary (1990–present)
1990–1993: David Reddaway, Chargé d'affaires
1993–1997: Sir Jeffrey Russell James, Chargé d'affaires
1997–2002: Sir Nicholas Browne
2003–2006: Sir Richard Dalton
2006–2009: Sir Geoffrey Adams
2009–2011: Sir Simon Gass
2011–2011: Dominick Chilcott
The British Embassy in Tehran was closed following an attack on the Embassy on 29 November 2011. Sweden represented British interests in Iran through a British interests section at the Swedish Embassy in Tehran. On 11 November 2013 the UK government appointed a non-resident chargé d'affaires to Iran.
2013–2015: Ajay Sharma (non-resident Chargé d'affaires)
On 23 August 2015 the UK embassy in Tehran was reopened and the Chargé d'affaires moved to be resident there. The Chargé d'affaires was made Ambassador in September 2016.
August–November 2015: Ajay Sharma (chargé d'affaires)
December 2015–March 2018: Nicholas Hopton (as Chargé d'affaires until September 2016; then as Ambassador Extraordinary and Plenipotentiary)

April 2018–August 2021: Robert Macaire
August 2021–present: Simon Shercliff

See also
 List of Iranian Ambassadors to the United Kingdom
 Robert Macaire

References

External links
UK and Iran, gov.uk

Iran
 
United Kingdom